Timman is a Dutch surname. Notable people with the surname include:

Jan Timman (born 1951), Dutch chess Grandmaster 
Paul Timman (born 1972), American tattoo artist and dinnerware designer

Dutch-language surnames